DYWB (630 AM) Bombo Radyo is a radio station owned and operated by Bombo Radyo Philippines through its licensee People's Broadcasting Service. Its studio and transmitter are located at Bombo Radyo Broadcast Center, Lacson St., Brgy. Mandalagan, Bacolod. During the station's off-air hours, the spillover signals of Manila-based DZMM of ABS-CBN Corporation and Jakarta-based Radio Samhan can be heard on this frequency albeit on a weaker signal. Also Bombo Radyo Bacolod was heard far as Central Luzon and Metro Manila and surrounding areas at night via weak signal.

References

Radio stations established in 1968
Radio stations in Bacolod